Pukar (Urdu: پُکار) is a 1939 Urdu film produced and directed by Sohrab Modi at the production house, Minerva Movietone. The film is about Mughal emperor Jehangir's legendary justice and his inner conflict when his wife kills an innocent citizen by mistake.

The movie is a typical Sohrab Modi production (which always seemed to be historical) with heavy and lengthy Urdu dialogues said in a loud and dramatic style. Story and lyrics are by Kamal Amrohi. Pukar is considered to be the earliest Muslim social film.

Plot
Set at the court of the harsh, but just Mughal Emperor Jehangir (Chandra Mohan), the film tells two separate love stories: the first of Mangal Singh (Ali) and Kanwar (Sheela) amid the violent feud raging between their families, and the second, the famous story of Jehangir and Nurjehan (Banu). Mangal kills the brother and father of his lover when they accuse him of dishonouring them and attack him. His father, the loyal Rajput chieftain Sangram Singh (Modi), captures his son and Jehangir passes the death sentence. Jehangir's claim that the law knows no class distinction is put on the test when a washerwoman (Akhtar) accuses Queen Nurjehan of having inadvertently killed her husband while shooting a bow and arrow. Since the washerwoman's husband was killed by the Queen, claiming to be acting in justice, Jehangir says that the washerwoman should shoot him in the same fashion, as he is the Queen's husband. All the courtiers protest and Sangram Singh says that the emperor's life belongs to the people and the washerwoman agrees to take compensation in the form of wealth. Nurjehan suggests a general amnesty for all prisoners, which is granted by Jehangir so that Nurjehan is then not a special case, thus Mangal Singh and Kanwar can marry.

Cast
 Sohrab Modi as  Sardar Sangram Singh
 Chandra Mohan as Jahangir
 Naseem Banu as Nur Jahan
 Sheela as Kanwar
 Sardar Akhtar as Rami Dhoban
 Sadiq Ali as Mangal Singh
 Babu Singh as Ramu Dhobhi

References

External links 
 
 Full movie on YouTube

1939 films
1930s Urdu-language films
Indian historical films
Indian black-and-white films
Films directed by Sohrab Modi
Films set in the Mughal Empire
Films about royalty
Articles containing video clips
1930s historical films
Cultural depictions of Jahangir
Urdu-language Indian films